The Assassination of Richard Nixon is a 2004 American drama film directed by Niels Mueller and starring Sean Penn, Don Cheadle, Jack Thompson and Naomi Watts. It is based on the story of would-be assassin Samuel Byck, who plotted to kill Richard Nixon in 1974. It was screened in the Un Certain Regard section at the 2004 Cannes Film Festival. The last name of the main character was changed to Bicke.

Plot
In 1973, 43-year-old Philadelphia resident Sam Bicke (Sean Penn) is a down on his luck salesman who desperately wishes to reconcile with his estranged wife Marie (Naomi Watts). A constant moralizer, he states that he stopped working at the tire shop owned by his brother Julius (Michael Wincott) because he would lie to his customers. Believing that society's discrimination affects poor white people just as much as it does blacks, he attempts to join the Black Panthers. His dream is to own his own mobile tire sales business in partnership with his best friend, African-American mechanic Bonny (Don Cheadle).

He finds employment at an office furniture retail business, where his new boss Jack (Jack Thompson) gives him patronizing advice, while his awkwardness makes him a poor salesman. Jack describes US president Richard Nixon as the greatest salesman in history, because his election promise in 1968 was to exit the Vietnam War, and four years later he again coasted to win an easy re-election in 1972 on the promise of ending the same war.

Bicke becomes increasingly disillusioned with his status in society. He applies for a government loan to set up the business with Bonny, and he frantically waits for an answer in the mail. His sales figures continue to deteriorate, and Jack, who only hires married salesmen, begins to suspect Sam lied about his marriage. In fact, Marie keeps rebutting all of Sam's awkward attempts at reconciling, and later sends him a divorce decree, leaving him weeping in despair. Shortly afterwards, he deliberately destroys a sale by turning up the television volume in the showroom as Jack negotiates with a prospective customer and thereafter quits his job. While watching Nixon giving a speech on TV during the Watergate scandal, he screams at him, "It's about money, Dick!" With the loan still not finalized, he breaks into his brother's tire sales business to make a large order that will be delivered to Bonny. Ultimately, the loan is rejected, his rent is past due, and his brother Julius reveals he had to bail out Bonny, who was arrested for receiving stolen goods, and is now done entirely with his deadbeat, hypocritical brother.

A broken Sam begins obsessing more and more about Nixon. One night, after watching a news story about a helicopter pilot who did a fly-by around the White House and got arrested, he begins putting together a plan to hijack a passenger airliner and crash it into the White House. In the two weeks leading to his action, he records a message detailing his intentions and state of mind and addressed to Leonard Bernstein, whom he greatly admires.

Sam liquidates his bank account, steals Bonny's gun, and heads to a restaurant where Jack is dining. He aims the gun at Jack under the table, but cannot pull the trigger and flees. He goes to his and Marie's old house and sleeps in the empty home, then shoots and kills the family dog. The next morning, he drives to the Baltimore–Washington International Airport with the gun concealed against his leg and a suitcase full of gasoline. After mailing his confession to Bernstein, he plans to wait in line to board a flight, but seeing the security procedures are more thorough than expected, he panics and rushes on board, shooting a cop as he goes.

Once on board he haphazardly shoots one pilot in the head and the other in the shoulder, then finds a passenger to act as co-pilot. However, he is shot through a window by an intervening policeman, but commits suicide before he could be killed or arrested. The day's events are shown on TV, though neither Bonny nor Marie appear to react to the mention of Sam's name.

Cast
 Sean Penn as Samuel "Sam" Bicke, a salesman with a history of short-lived jobs
 Naomi Watts as Marie Andersen Bicke, Sam's ex-wife
 Don Cheadle as Bonny Simmons, Sam's best friend and potential business partner
 Jack Thompson as Jack Jones, Sam's new employer at a furniture retail
 Mykelti Williamson as Harold Mann, head of the local Black Panther chapter
 Michael Wincott as Julius Bicke, Sam's brother
 Nick Searcy as Tom Ford, director of the local loan agency
 Brad William Henke as Martin Jones, Jack's son and a salesman
 Joe Marinelli as Mel Samuels

Reception
On Rotten Tomatoes the film has an approval rating of 67% based on reviews from 132 critics. On Metacritic the film has a score of 68% based on reviews from 38 critics, indicating "generally favorable reviews".

Empire gave the film four stars out of five stating, "it's great to see the courage of '70s Hollywood meeting the conviction of 21st-century indie cinema in this stark, bold drama." 
Roger Ebert gave it 3.5 out of 4 stars.

Stephen Hunter of The Washington Post wrote: "It grinds on without mercy. You're in the cross hairs. There is no escape. Where is that Secret Service when you need it?"

In popular culture
In 2018, in a discussion of Stephen Sondheim’s Assassins, Donald Clarke wrote in The Irish Times that "[t]he most interesting cinematic analysis of any character featured in Assassins may, however, be Niels Mueller’s fascinating, underappreciated The Assassination of Richard Nixon from 2004."

See also
 List of American films of 2004
 List of films based on actual events
 Bob Honey Who Just Do Stuff-a 2018 novel by Penn similar in content

References

External links
 
 Official trailer

2004 drama films
2004 films
2004 thriller drama films
American thriller drama films
Appian Way Productions films
American aviation films
Drama films based on actual events
Films about assassinations
Films directed by Niels Mueller
Films produced by Alfonso Cuarón
Films set in 1973
Films set in 1974
Films shot in Nebraska
Political films based on actual events
Films about Richard Nixon
Films about aircraft hijackings
Films set in the 1970s
2000s English-language films
2000s American films
Films about salespeople